The following outline is provided as an overview of and topical guide to manufacturing:

Manufacturing – use of machines, tools and labor to produce goods for use or sale. Includes a range of human activity, from handicraft to high-tech, but most commonly refers to industrial production, where raw materials are transformed into finished goods on a large scale.

Overview 

 Factory
 Heavy industry
 Light industry
 Mass production
 Production line

Some manufacturing industries 
 Aerospace industry
 Automotive industry
 Chemical industry
 Computer industry
 Electronics industry
 Food processing industry
 Garment industry
 Pharmaceutical industry
 Pulp and paper industry
 Toy industry

History 

 Handicraft

Origins of manufacturing 

Industrial Revolution

Emergence of the factory 

Factory

 History of the factory
 Factory system

Improvement of industrial processes 

Industrial process

Theories applied to manufacturing 

 Taylorism
 Fordism
 Scientific management

Operations of manufacturing

Organizational control 

 Management
 Total Quality Management
 Quality control
 Six Sigma

Manufacturing systems 
 Craft or Guild system
 American System of manufacturing
 British factory system of manufacturing
 Soviet collectivism in manufacturing
 Mass production
 Just In Time manufacturing
 Lean manufacturing
 Flexible manufacturing
 Mass customization
 Agile manufacturing
 Rapid manufacturing
 Prefabrication
 Toyota production system
 Financial system
 Public and commerce industry
 Accrual basis
 Cash basis
 Merchandising inventory
 Trade discount
 Sales discount
 Memorandum

 Additive manufacturing
 Subtractive manufacturing
 Agile manufacturing
 Fabrication
 Flexible manufacturing
 Just-in-time manufacturing
 Lean manufacturing
 Manufacturing engineering
 Mass customization
 Mass production
 Numerical control
 Prefabrication
 Rapid manufacturing
 Reconfigurable manufacturing system
 High performance positioning system

Product design 
 Rapid prototyping
 Computer aided design
 New product development
 Toolkits for User Innovation
 Configuration systems

Manufacturing engineering 

 Production engineering
 Industrial engineering
 Computer-aided manufacturing
 Computer integrated manufacturing
 Numerically controlled
 Computer numerically controlled
 Distributed control systems
 Fieldbus control systems
 PLCs
 Packaging and labeling

Assembly systems 
 Assembly line

Modern manufacturing processes 

Taxonomy of manufacturing processes

Manufacturing process management

Concepts 

 Capital (economics)
 Capital investment
 Consumer
 Conveyor belt
 Depreciation
 Distributor
 Factory
 Fixed asset
 Industrial process
 Machine tool
 Manufacturing
 Mass production
 Plant
 Primary sector
 Procurement
 Production line
 Raw materials
 Retailer
 Supply chain
 Warehouse
 Wholesaler
 Workers

Lists 
 Outline of engineering
 Outline of business management
 Outline of production
 Outline of marketing
 Outline of economics
 Outline of finance
 List of international trade topics
 List of accounting topics
 List of business law topics
 List of human resource management topics
 List of business theorists
 List of economists
 List of largest manufacturing companies by revenue

By country 
 Manufacturing in Australia
 Manufacturing in Chad
 Manufacturing in China
 Manufacturing in Ethiopia
 Manufacturing in Ghana
 Manufacturing in Hong Kong
 Manufacturing in Japan
 Manufacturing in Mexico
 Manufacturing in Puerto Rico
 Manufacturing in Vietnam
 Manufacturing in the United Kingdom
 Manufacturing in the United States
 Manufacturing in India

See also 

 Business - for the economics and commercial management of a manufacturing company.
 Commercial law - for the law as applied to businesses.
 Industry classification - for the classification of manufacturers.
 Management and General manager - for the general management of a business.
 Political economy - for the political impact of the development of industry.
 Product lifecycle management - for the role of computer technology in manufacturing.

Manufacturing
Manufacturing
 
Manufacturing topics
Manufacturing

mk:Преглед на производство